Caeté River is a river of Acre state in western Brazil, a tributary of the Iaco River.

The Caeté River flows through the centre of the  Cazumbá-Iracema Extractive Reserve, established in 2002 to support sustainable use of the natural resources by the traditional population.

See also
List of rivers of Acre

References

Rivers of Acre (state)